The Sun Rise 34, sometimes just called the Sun Rise, is a French sailboat that was designed by Jacques Fauroux as a cruiser and first built in 1984.

Production
The design was built by Jeanneau in France, from 1984 until 1989, with 629 boats built.

Design
The Sun Rise 34 is a recreational keelboat, built predominantly of polyester fiberglass, with wood trim. It has a masthead sloop rig, with a deck-stepped mast, two sets of unswept spreaders and aluminum spars with 1X19 stainless steel wire rigging. The hull has a raked stem, a reverse transom, a skeg-mounted rudder controlled by a tiller with an extension and a fixed fin keel or optional stub keel and centerboard. The fin keel model displaces  and carries  of cast iron ballast, while the centerboard version displaces  and carries  of cast iron exterior ballast, with a steel centerboard.

The boat is fitted with a Japanese Yanmar 2GM20F diesel engine for docking and maneuvering.

The boat was built with two interiors: "team" and "owners". The team version has sleeping accommodation for eight people, with a double "V"-berth in the bow cabin, an "L"-shaped settee and a straight settee in the main cabin and two aft cabins with double berths. The galley is located on the port side just forward of the companionway ladder. The galley is "L"-shaped and is equipped with a two-burner stove, an ice box and a double sink. A navigation station is opposite the galley, on the starboard side. The head is located just aft of the navigation station on the starboard side.

The "owners" model has sleeping accommodation for six people, with a double "V"-berth in the bow cabin, an "L"-shaped settee and a straight settee in the main cabin and an aft cabin with a double berth on the starboard side. The galley is located on the starboard side just forward of the companionway ladder. The galley is "L"-shaped and is equipped with a two-burner stove, an ice box and a double sink. A navigation station is opposite the galley, on the port side. The head is located just aft of the navigation station on the port side and includes a shower. There is also a sink in the aft cabin.

See also
List of sailing boat types

References

External links

Keelboats
1980s sailboat type designs
Sailing yachts
Sailboat type designs by Jacques Fauroux
Sailboat types built by Jeanneau